Honduran Revolutionary Party (Partido Revolucionario Hondureño) was a small clandestine leftist party in Honduras, which was formed in 1961 by former members of the Communist Party of Honduras who sought a more "scientifically Marxist" platform. PRH was active in the peasants' movement. In 1993, the PRH merged with three other groups to form the Democratic Unification Party.

References

Defunct political parties in Honduras
Marxist parties in Honduras